Dirck is a given name. Notable people with the name include:

Dirck Barendsz (1534–1592), Dutch Renaissance painter from Amsterdam
Dirck Bleker (1621–1702), Dutch Golden Age painter
Dirck Coornhert (1522–1590), Dutch writer, philosopher, translator, politician and theologian
Dirck Cornelis de Hooch (1613–1651), 17th-century Dutch portrait painter
Dirck de Bray (1635–1694), Dutch Golden Age painter
Dirck Ferreris (1639–1693), Dutch Golden Age painter
Dirck Gerritsz Pomp (1544–1608), Dutch sailor, the first known Dutchman to visit Japan
Dirck Hals (1591–1656), Dutch painter of festivals and ballroom scenes
Dirck Halstead, (born 1936), photojournalist, and editor and publisher of The Digital Journalist
Dirck Helmbreker (1633–1696), Dutch Golden Age painter of Italianate landscapes
Dirck Jacobsz. (1496–1567), Dutch Renaissance painter
Dirck Pesser (1585–1651), Dutch brewer from Rotterdam
Dirck Rembrantsz van Nierop (1610–1682), Dutch cartographer, mathematician, surveyor, astronomer, teacher and preacher
Dirck Storm (1630–1716), early colonial American, recorded the history of the Dutch community at Sleepy Hollow
Dirck Ten Broeck (1765–1832), American lawyer and politician
Dirck Tulp or Diederik Tulp (1624–1682), son of surgeon professor Nicolaes Tulp, involved in the Dutch East India Company and the Civic guard
Dirck van Baburen (1595–1624), Dutch painter associated with the Utrecht Caravaggisti
Dirck van Bergen (1645–1700), Dutch Golden Age landscape painter
Dirck van Cloon (1684–1735), Eurasian Governor-General of the Dutch East Indies
Dirck van der Lisse (1607–1669), Dutch Golden Age painter
Dirck van Santvoort (1610–1680), Dutch Golden Age painter
Peter Dirck Keyser (born 1835), United States ophthalmologist

See also
Dirk (name)

de:Dirck